One Clear Call is the ninth novel in Upton Sinclair's Lanny Budd series. First published in 1948, the story covers the period from 1943 to 1944.

Plot

References

1948 American novels
American historical novels
Novels by Upton Sinclair
Fiction set in 1943
Fiction set in 1944